The University of Texas at San Antonio (UTSA) is a public research university in San Antonio, Texas. With over 34,000 students across its four campuses spanning 758 acres, UTSA is the largest university in San Antonio and the eighth-largest by enrollment in the state of Texas. It is classified among "R1: Doctoral Universities – Very High Research Activity" and offers 159 degree options from its nine colleges.

Established in 1969, UTSA has become the third largest institution within the University of Texas System by enrollment. The university has a local economic impact of $1.2 billion and the UTSA Institute for Economic Development generates $2.9 billion in direct economic impact nationwide. The university's restricted research expenditures have grown to $64.3 million while total research expenditures grew to $134 million in FY20.

Student-athletes compete as the UTSA Roadrunners and are a member of Conference USA. The football team, which was founded in 2011, has competed in Conference USA since 2013, previously playing a stint in the WAC and as an FCS independent.

History

Establishment (1969 to 1970s)
The University of Texas at San Antonio was officially founded on June 5, 1969, by the 61st Texas Legislature as H.B. 42 and signed into law by Governor Preston Smith. Frank Lombardino, a conservative Democrat who represented northwest Bexar County in the state legislature, was known as the "father of UTSA" due to his impassioned advocacy for the institution. When Governor Smith signed the bill officially establishing the university, he did so on the back of Lombardino in a ceremony in front of the Alamo. At the university's inaugural commencement, the first diploma was also signed on Lombardino's back.

The architecture firm of Ford, Powell and Carson Inc. was assigned to develop a master plan for the university. O'Neil Ford, the designer of both the Tower of the Americas and the Trinity University tower, designed the campus to be reminiscent of an Italian village.

The 671 graduate students composing the first class at the university were admitted in September 1973. Upperclassmen and lowerclassmen were admitted in 1975 and 1976, respectively. Students temporarily attended class at the Koger Center, which also housed administrative offices until 1975, when construction on the Main Campus was completed. Enrollment during this time numbered 4,433 students. UTSA began with five colleges: Business, Fine and Applied Arts, Humanities and Social Sciences, Multidisciplinary Studies and Science and Mathematics.

By 1975, the university's future colors were being openly discussed among student leaders and the administration. UTSA's third color of blue was selected, beating out other proposed colors such as "fiesta red" and "cactus green". The John Peace Library opened the next year, serving as the new administrative headquarters for the university.

The discussion of a university mascot soon followed the selection of school colors. In the fall of 1977 an election was held to determine the school's mascot, with "the armadillos" and "the stars" taking the top two spots. However, the referendum was declared void by the student government and a new election was held with nine candidates and a write-in option. The top two choices from the second election, the roadrunner and the armadillo, campaigned in a competitive run-off. On December 9, 1977, the roadrunner was announced as UTSA's first and only mascot.

James W. Wagener, a graduate of Southern Methodist University and former acting dean of the University of Texas Health Science Center, was selected to be UTSA's third president in 1978. The Alumni Association was formed that same year, providing a new avenue of support for the university. The first Fiesta UTSA was also held in April 1978, with multiple bands playing throughout the day and culminating in a school dance. At the end of the 1970s, enrollment numbered 9,400 undergraduate and graduate students.

Early years (1980s to 1999) 
 The Paisano, the university's award-winning newspaper, was established in 1981 as the first independent student publication in the state. During the fall of that year, the university began playing collegiate athletics. It was immediately elected to Division I status in the NCAA. The Student Representative Assembly headed the burial of a time capsule in 1983, the university's 10th anniversary, instructing it to be opened on June 5, 2023.

In 1986, UTSA acquired the Institute of Texan Cultures, a center for multicultural education in the state, as a campus. During this year, both the University Center and Chisholm Hall, the university's first on-campus housing complex, opened. 

In 1994 the U.S. Department of Education designated UTSA as a Hispanic Serving Institution (HSI).

On the first day of fall classes in 1996, a campus shooter stormed into the John Peace Library. The perpetrator, Gregory Tidwell, murdered head of cataloging Stephen L. Sorensen before fatally shooting himself in the chest.

The University Center grew significantly in the late 1990s, breaking ground on its newest expansion in 1995. This new 97,500-square foot, $13.2 million building, dubbed "UC Phase II", included the new Retama Auditorium and UTSA Bookstore. The Downtown Campus opened the doors to its permanent location on Interstate Highway 10 and Cesar Chavez Blvd. (then Durango Blvd.) in 1997.

Ricardo Romo, a graduate of The University of Texas at Austin and UCLA, became UTSA's fifth president in May 1999. He began with the ambitious agenda of aggressively expanding UTSA, both physically and academically, laying out the university's "Roadmap to Excellence". During his tenure, UTSA would grow 68% in student enrollment and add numerous new programs and facilities.

Expansion and growth (2000 to 2010) 

In the mid-2000s decade, UTSA embarked on a long-term campaign to dramatically increase its national prestige and selectivity. A "Master Plan" was created in 2007 as a guide for this campaign and to direct the future physical growth of the institution. The "UTSA 2016" strategic plan, formulated at the same time, is guided by the Master Plan and forms the basis for the development of the university into a "premier research institution" by 2016. John T. Montford—a San Antonio businessman, former chancellor of the Texas Tech University System, and a member of the Texas State Senate from 1983 to 1996—eventually established the UTSA presidents Dinner and, in 2007, the event raised US$4.6 million.

From 2006 to 2009, UTSA completed over $250 million in construction projects. The $84 million five-story Biotechnology, Sciences and Engineering (BSE) Building opened its doors in 2006. The university underwent extensive remodeling in 2009, renovating older buildings such as the John Peace Library (JPL), the Humanities and Social Sciences (HSS, now known as the McKinney Humanities or MH) and the Multidisciplinary Studies (MS) buildings. A new ceramics studio broke ground in 2009 and two adjacent science buildings underwent $24 million in renovations. The $83 million Applied Engineering and Technology building (AET) also opened its doors in 2009. A year later the AET Library opened as the nation's first completely bookless library on a college or university campus.

Proposition 4 was passed by Texas voters in November 2009. This piece of legislation named 7 emerging research universities in Texas, UTSA being one, that could compete for additional state funds in an effort to increase the number of Tier One institutions in Texas. Factors such as research expenditures, graduate degrees awarded and scholarly productivity all play a part in which schools receive the most funding.

Modern university (2011 to current) 

The first-time undergraduate acceptance rate, a common measurement for institutional selectivity, was 60% for the Fall of 2013. U.S. News & World Report ranks UTSA's admissions process as "selective". In 2010, the university hit a population benchmark of 30,000 students, signifying a growth rate of more than 39% over the past decade. UTSA was one of the fastest growing universities in Texas during this decade reaching nearly 31,000 students by 2012.

However, in 2011, the Center for College Affordability and Productivity ranked UTSA's freshman as the second most "unhappy" in the country, based solely on low retention rates. Associate Vice President David Gabler refuted this claim, telling 1200 WOAI the survey is completely "bogus". The members of Student Government Association responded by sponsoring a resolution rebuking the claims, pointing out the Coordinated Admissions Program skews freshmen retention rates. As of 2011, roughly 30% of CAP students do not return to the university for their second year.

The North Paseo Building, a $15 million office building, began housing ROTC operations when it opened in October 2011. The Bauerle Road Garage, a 5-level parking facility with office space, opened in 2012. Dining services also expanded in 2008, continuing through 2011.

That same year, the university also fielded its long-anticipated football team as an NCAA FCS independent, with Larry Coker as the inaugural head coach. Today the university has nearly 150,000 alumni, 17 athletic sports, and more than 1200 tenured and tenure-track faculty. The following year, 2012, UTSA, the city's sole NCAA Division I university at the time, became a member of the Western Athletic Conference; one year later, it moved to Conference USA. An athletic complex was constructed slightly west of the main campus and features pedestrian-friendly mixed-use areas. The complex, dubbed "Park West", adds another 125 acres to the university's property.

Ricardo Romo, who had served as president since 1999, resigned on March 3, 2017, after having been placed on administrative leave. Pedro Reyes served as interim president from February through August 2017. On September 1, 2017, Thomas Taylor Eighmy, the vice chancellor for research and engagement at the University of Tennessee at Knoxville, began serving as UTSA's sixth president.

UTSA has become a nationally ranked research university with US$68.1 million delegated toward research expenditures for fiscal year 2017. A stated goal of the UTSA Master Plan is the enhancement of the university's research infrastructure.

On June 9, 2017, UTSA introduced the largest construction project in its history with the announcement of a $95 Million Science And Engineering Building which opened in Fall 2020. On September 6, 2018, UTSA announced it had received a $15 million gift from San Antonio business leader Graham Weston and  $70 million commitment from The University of Texas System Board of Regents for construction of two new facilities at its Downtown Campus for a National Security Collaboration Center and a proposed School of Data Science which opened January 9, 2023 and became the first and only Data Science school in the state of Texas.

In November 2018, a video emerged online of a Black student being escorted out of an A&P lecture by uniformed officers. The student had allegedly been resting her feet on the chair in front of her and when her professor asked her to sit properly, she purportedly refused. The professor then called campus police. Reaction to the video led the university's President Taylor Eighmy to issue a statement saying the university needed to "take a hard look at our campus climate — especially for students of color — and enact systemic change to make UTSA a more inclusive campus." The University conducted an investigation into the incident, with the professor suspended for the remainder of the semester. The investigation found that racial bias was not a factor in the incident, and the professor completed classroom management training through the university's Teaching and Learning Services. After returning to the classroom in 2019, the professor was suspended again and a second investigation conducted by the university. A petition saying she had been "ousted unfairly", and requesting her reinstatement was signed by over 900 students, however the she was not asked to return to the university.

It was announced on June 29, 2021, that the departments and programs under both The College of Engineering and the College of Architecture, Construction and Planning were to be combined to form the new College of Engineering and Integrated Design (CEID) at UTSA which was officially launched on September 1, 2021. Soon after CEID's announcement, UTSA revealed that it would be acquiring the Southwest School of Art. The art school became part of a new school within UTSA's College of Liberal and Fine Arts, thus expanding the university's geographical footprint in San Antonio.

Campuses

Main Campus 

The Main Campus, the oldest and largest of the three, was born out of a 600-acre donation to the University of Texas Board of Regents. It proved to be so controversially remote to the city (at the time) that many San Antonians nicknamed it "University of Texas at Boerne" or "UT Boerne". The Main Campus opened its doors in 1975. Prior to that, classes were held at the Koger Center at Babcock Road and Loop 410. Roadrunner Cafe, the university's first dining hall, was erected in 2005. In 2006, UTSA acquired a 125-acre swath of land on Hausman Road to build its future athletics complex, bringing the Main Campus up to 725 acres in total. Up until 2009, it was known as the "1604 Campus", at which point it was renamed the "Main Campus" so as to better reflect its importance within the university and community as a whole. Students can also live at one of the campus' six housing complexes: Chisholm Hall, Alvarez Hall, Guadalupe Hall, Laurel Village, Chaparral Village and University Oaks.

In 2014 the "New" North Paseo building (NPB) was completed and now houses Computer Science and Cyber Security labs and classrooms. The NPB is also home to the Center for Infrastructure Assurance and Security (CIAS), Center for Education and Research in Information and Infrastructure Security (CERIIS), and the Institute for Cyber Security. The architecture firm that was responsible for the NPB received an honor from the AIA Austin Design Awards Competition.

The UTSA Master Plan, is the university's structural plan for the future, focuses on developing the Main Campus in several key areas. Its plans for the campus include the expansion of academic facilities, major growth in on-campus amenities, implementing a long-term strategy for parking and the establishment of a college town.

Downtown Campus 

The Downtown Campus in Downtown San Antonio houses parts of the College of Engineering and Integrated Design, College for Health, Community and Policy, and College of Education and Human Development. Many of the university's community outreach centers and institutes including the Texas State Data Center and The Urban Education Institute are located at the downtown campus as well. In early 1993, the demolition of Fiesta Plaza made way for what would become the Downtown Campus. While construction was underway, the campus made its temporary home at Cypress Tower on Main Street, offering its first classes in January 1994. Its permanent location on I-10 and Cesar E. Chavez Boulevard (formerly Durango Boulevard) was completed in 1997. Today, the Downtown Campus is composed of four buildings, an 18,138 square foot library and parking for over 2,200 vehicles all in over 18 acres of space. A new bus-rapid transit line, VIA Primo, opened in late 2012. Together with a VIA Express route, allows students to quickly commute between the UTSA Main Campus and the Downtown Campus. The Master Plan states some of goals for the Downtown Campus include the expansion of on-campus amenities, the reinforcement of the campus' identity and the growth of civic spaces.

In 2018 UTSA President Eighmy announced a new $90 million 10-year advancement plan for the downtown campus which includes a $15 million gift from San Antonio business leader Graham Weston to support the university's proposed School of Data Science. At the same time, UTSA actively engaged in highly collaborative discussions with the City of San Antonio and Bexar County for the transfer of downtown parcels of land, valued at $13 million, to the university. Those parcels became the sites for the new school, a National Security Collaboration Center, and for the expansion of the UTSA College of Business.

Hemisfair Campus 
The Hemisfair Campus, also in Downtown San Antonio, stands as the third branch of UTSA, holding the 182,000 square-foot Institute of Texan Cultures. It hosts the Texas Folklife Festival, an annual event celebrating the various cultures of Texas and their roles in the multicultural state. The ITC (as it is commonly known) was originally built as a $10 million project for HemisFair '68, with the stated goal of promoting awareness of the history and ethnic diversity of Texas. It was turned over to the University of Texas System after the conclusion of the world's fair, being designated as a campus of UTSA in 1986. It serves as a valuable asset for historical research, housing both UTSA's archives and an impressive historic photography collection with over 3 million images. The ITC formalized an agreement with the Smithsonian Institution in 2010 to obtain affiliate status. As an affiliate of the Smithsonian, the institute has access to much of its vast resources, such as workshops, speakers and programs. Funding for the ITC primarily comes from legislative appropriations, event admissions fees, grants and contributions. The City of San Antonio is currently developing a long-term strategic plan for HemisFair Park, and the university is still considering multiple options for its own vision of the facility. As UTSA continues to grow and expand, the institute will develop alongside it as a nationally recognized research institution of equal caliber.

Park West Campus 
Located less than 2 miles west of the Main campus, the 125-acre Park West Campus is currently home to the UTSA Roadrunners soccer and track-and-field facilities. Park West is also designated as a host site for community sporting events. Construction of a new 80,000-square-foot state of the art outpatient facility is slated to be complete by summer 2023, once complete it will offer Student-athletes access to enhanced imaging and surgical services, primary care, orthopedics, physical therapy and other specialties. The center will ultimately support the sports medicine program for UTSA student-athletes and provide future collaborative opportunities in academics, research and health care delivery.

Academics

The University of Texas at San Antonio is composed of nine colleges that offer 66 bachelor's, 68 master's, and 25 doctoral degree programs in total: the Alvarez College of Business; the College of Education and Human Development; the College of Engineering and Integrated Design; the Honors College; the College of Liberal and Fine Arts; the College for Health, Community and Policy; the College of Sciences and University College. All programs are fully accredited by the Southern Association of Colleges and Schools, and the UTSA College of Business is accredited by the Association to Advance Collegiate Schools of Business.

The College of Sciences collaborates with other leading research institutions in San Antonio such as Southwest Research Institute, Texas Biomedical Research Institute and UT Health-San Antonio. Since 2005, UTSA and Southwest Research Institute have maintained a joint doctoral program focusing on space physics.

UTSA is the receipt of the CAE-Cyber Operations, CAE-Information Assurance Research (CAE-R), and CAE-Cyber Defense designations making it one of the few universities in the nation to hold three National Center of Excellence designations from the National Security Agency.

UTSA, which is designated as a Hispanic Serving Institution, became the recipient of Excelencia in Education's Seal of Excelencia in 2020 and is one of only 14 colleges and universities nationwide to earn this prestigious certification. 

Students and alumni at UTSA have been awarded prestigious fellowships such as the Ford Foundation Fellowship, National Science Foundation's Research Fellowship, The Barry Goldwater Scholarship and Excellence in Education Foundation, and the Fulbright scholarship. In 2021 UTSA was the only Texas university to receive four Barry Goldwater Scholars awards, being accompanied by fellow national universities such as Carnegie Mellon University, University of Michigan, Massachusetts Institute of Technology, and Harvard University.

The Human Health Initiative, launched by UTSA in November 2018, resulted in The College for Health, Community and Policy being established in 2019 as an innovative new college dedicated to advancing human health. The six-year undergraduate graduation rate of UTSA's Roadrunner cohort increased to 50.8%, as of Fall 2019.

Colleges 

Alvarez College of Business
School of Data Science
College of Education and Human Development
Klesse College of Engineering and Integrated Design
College for Health, Community and Policy
Honors College
College of Liberal and Fine Arts
College of Sciences
University College

Rankings

U.S. News & World Report ranks UTSA among national universities, which have a full range of undergraduate and graduate programs and are committed to producing groundbreaking research. According to U.S. News & World Reports 2022 rankings, UTSA is ranked 299–391 among national universities,156–209 among U.S. public ones, and 26th in the nation as a Top Performer on Social Mobility.

UTSA was recognized by Times Higher Education as one of the best universities under 50 years old in 2012, 2013, 2014, 2016, 2017, 2018, and 2019.

In 2014 UTSA was ranked the top Cybersecurity program in the nation according to a national survey of certified information technology security professionals conducted by The Ponemon Institute for Hewlett-Packard. As of 2016, the UTSA cybersecurity graduate programs ranked among the top two in the nation with Carnegie Mellon University being the top program .

In the 2019 edition of the 100 Most Secure College Campuses in the US, UTSA was ranked the 2nd safest university in the state of Texas and the 30th safest in the United States.

Intelligent.com 2020 edition of Best Online Cyber Security Degrees ranked UTSA's online cybersecurity degree program 15th overall in the nation and first in the nation in providing academic support for students pursuing a cybersecurity degree online. UTSA's online cybersecurity program also ranked first overall in the state of Texas.

In the 2020 Global M.B.A. Rankings by CEO Magazine, The College of Business’ Executive M.B.A. program at UTSA is ranked 8th globally. In addition, UTSA's M.B.A. program is ranked as a Tier One Global M.B.A. program.

The College of Architecture, Construction and Planning ranks second in the nation in awarding degrees to Hispanic students, according to Hispanic Outlook in Higher Education.

Research
The University of Texas at San Antonio is classified among "R1: Doctoral Universities – Very High Research Activity" and as a "Texas Tier One" institution.  The university reached a new record of $140 million for research expenditures in fiscal year 2021. UTSA students and faculty conduct advanced research in many cross-disciplinary fields of study. Identified areas of research excellence include Advanced Materials, Cloud Computing, Cyber Security and Data Analytics, Integrative Biomedicine, Social and Educational Transformation, and Sustainable Communities and Critical Infrastructure. UTSA is home to 33 research centers and institutes and is a member of the National Academies' Government-University-Industry Research Roundtable (GUIRR).

UTSA operated the Center for Archaeological Research, which in 1984 did a study of the former Hot Wells hotel, spa and bathhouse on the San Antonio River in the southside of San Antonio. The survey determined all which remained of the resort were remnants of the 1902 hotel building, bathhouse ruins, and stones of a small nearby building. In 2015, work was authorized by the Bexar County Commissioners Court to begin restoring Hot Wells.

A 2007 study released by Academic Analytics showed UTSA was ranked fifth among other large research universities in the state of Texas for faculty scholarly productivity. The Office of the Vice President for Research publishes "Discovery", an annual magazine dedicated to highlighting the research, academic and creative achievements of the UTSA community. First printed in 2007, the publication is a member of the University Research Magazine Association, an organization that promotes excellence among the scholarly publications of universities.

A three-year partnership between UTSA and Microsoft was announced in April 2014. The purpose of the arrangement is the research and development of sustainable technologies to increase the energy efficiency and economic viability of data centers.

The University of Texas at San Antonio is home to the Curtis Vaughan Jr. Observatory and a member of the Association of Universities for Research in Astronomy (AURA), a consortium of US institutions and international affiliates that operates world-class astronomical observatories on behalf of NASA and NSF.

The UTSA Center for Advanced Measurements in Extreme Environments (CAMEE) collaborates with NASA to push the boundaries of current measurement and modeling technology by conducting research in harsh and extreme environments. CAMEE also studies the challenging conditions produced when traveling at hypersonic speeds.

The U.S. Department of Energy selected UTSA to lead the Cybersecurity Manufacturing Innovation Institute (CyManII). This federal research institute focuses on achieving energy efficiency, job creation, technical innovation and security of supply chain networks and automation for goods such as electric vehicles, solar panels and wind turbines. The National Security Collaboration Center (NSCC) at UTSA, is the home base for the CyManII.

UTSA Research Centers and Institutes

Programs

FAME 
In 2013, the University of Texas at San Antonio established Facilitated Acceptance to Medical Education (FAME), an accelerated medical program to rising high school seniors. Accepted students, after completing a three-year undergraduate education at UTSA, matriculate to UT Health-San Antonio.

Bold Promise 
In December 2019, UTSA established the Bold Promise program which offers high-quality, affordable education to incoming freshmen who come from middle and low-income Texan families. Those that qualify will have their tuition and fees covered 100% for eight fall/spring semesters taken within a 4-year time period. Costs are covered by scholarships, grants or tuition exemptions from federal, state and/or institutional funds.

UTSA Top Scholar 
Launched in fall 2013, the UTSA Top Scholar program is a premier scholar program combining a comprehensive, four-year, merit based scholarship with personalized experiences in academics, leadership and service, including a global opportunity, for high achieving students.

Student life

There are 350 student organizations on campus. Some organizations that receive funding from the University Student Services fee. These sponsored student organizations are the only Registered Student Organizations (RSOs) that may use "UTSA" in their name.

Beaks Up Speak Up is an organization supported by the UTSA Office of Student Activities, that educates the student body on issues related to being an active bystander.  The organization facilitates a culture of care for all members of the UTSA community to recognize potential harm, choose to respond, and act in a way that positively influences the outcome for other people. The group facilitates workshops on a variety of topics that impact the physical, mental and emotional wellbeing of others, assists campus partners with resources that would aid in successfully reducing risk through their programming, and teaches marketable skills to students.

The Campus Activities Board (CAB) is the largest student program board on campus. It fosters traditions and community at the university by coordinating large-scale events such as Best Fest, Fiesta UTSA and various homecoming functions.

The College Democrats and College Republicans at UTSA both date back to the late 1970s. The two organizations have brought notable public officials to campus such as Bill White, Congressman Joaquin Castro, Congressman Pete Gallego, Judge Juanita Vasquez-Gardener, State Senator Joe J. Bernal, Councilman John Clamp, and Senator Bob Krueger.

Residential life

UTSA offers several options for on-campus housing:

Alvarez Hall ("Alvarez"): A four-story residence hall and the second newest housing complex on campus, opened in the fall of 2013, with 618 students. It is situated next to Chaparral Village, Rec Fields, and the Convocation Center. Students are organized into "special interest communities", including the Engineering, Honors, Leadership and Service, First Gen Familia and Medical Humanities communities. Laundry facilities are in each wing.  A community kitchen and computer lab are in the second floor lobby.
Chaparral Village ("Chap"): Apartment-like suites with private bedrooms, fully furnished living rooms and a kitchenette are available in 2 or 4-bedroom configurations housing 1,000 students. Amenities include paid utilities, high-speed Internet access, cable, outdoor swimming pool and basketball court. Four Neighborhood Centers provide student residents with community kitchens, laundry and dishwashing appliances.
Chisholm Hall ("Chisholm"): The oldest housing complex on campus, opened in 1986; a four-story dormitory for approximately 500 student residents. It offers rooms in 1 and 2-person configurations, with an activity center, study lounges, and a community kitchen.
Guadalupe Hall ("Guad"): The $43.6 million four-story residence hall is designed for incoming honors students. In addition to dormitory rooms, a community kitchen, and laundry facilities, the building also offers multipurpose spaces for study groups and collaborative learning. Guadalupe Hall opened its doors to residents in the fall semester of 2021.
Laurel Village ("Laurel")': UTSA's third newest on-campus housing complex, completed in 2008, houses 678 students. Similar in design to Chaparral Village, Laurel residents are also able to use Chap's pool, hot tub, and outdoor picnic areas. Two Neighborhood Centers provide residents with community kitchens, laundry and dishwashing appliances.  Laurel offers a full-year leasing option for those in search of year-round housing.
University Oaks ("U Oaks" or simply "the Oaks"): Apartments with 1, 2, and 4-bedroom configurations; second-oldest housing complex on campus. Amenities include paid utilities, high-speed Internet access, and cable. "Rowdy Houses" provide residents with activity centers, 24-hour laundry service and pool access. University Oaks houses approximately 1,400 students in total.

Greek life
Greek life at UTSA is directed by the four governing bodies: the Panhellenic Council (6 chapters), the Interfraternity Council (11 chapters), the National Pan-Hellenic Council (7 chapters), and the Multicultural Greek Council (7 chapters). Greek life was first established in 1977 and since then has contributed greatly to student life all around campus.

The Interfraternity Council (IFC) oversees 11 fraternities. Member chapters include Alpha Epsilon Pi (Colony), Alpha Sigma Phi, Alpha Tau Omega, Kappa Sigma, Lambda Chi Alpha, Phi Delta Theta, Phi Gamma Delta (Colony), Pi Kappa Phi, Sigma Pi, Sigma Alpha Epsilon (Colony), and Tau Kappa Epsilon.  All organizations in the IFC belong to either the North-American Intrafraternity Conference or the Fraternity Leadership Association. Sigma Phi Epsilon, the university's oldest fraternity, and Phi Gamma Delta were both removed from campus in 2011 and 2009, respectively. Alpha Lambda Tau, a fraternity for homosexual men that received national attention, was also governed under the IFC while it was active.

The Panhellenic Council (PHC) oversees the women's social sororities of Alpha Delta Pi, Alpha Omicron Pi, Alpha Sigma Alpha, Gamma Phi Beta, Phi Mu, and Zeta Tau Alpha. Previous members of the Panhellenic Council include Alpha Sigma Tau (Beta Lambda, 1979-1982) and Sigma Kappa (Zeta Nu, 1978-2017). 

The National Pan-Hellenic Council (NPHC) has seven chapters.  Its members compose of historically African American entities that make up the Divine 9 that promote cultural diversity.  The seven chapters are Alpha Kappa Alpha, Delta Sigma Theta, Kappa Alpha Psi, Omega Psi Phi, Phi Beta Sigma, Zeta Phi Beta and Sigma Gamma Rho.

The Multicultural Greek Council, which promotes diversity among its membership, has seven chapters as of Spring 2018: Alpha Sigma Rho, Delta Xi Nu, Gamma Beta, Kappa Delta Chi, Omega Delta Phi, Sigma Lambda Alpha, and Sigma Lambda Beta.

ROTC programs
UTSA has one of the most extensive Reserve Officers' Training Corps (ROTC) programs in the United States and is the nation's seventh largest Air Force ROTC program with over 200 cadets. In 2009, the school's Air Force ROTC detachment won the Right of Line Award, the most prestigious award among all Air Force ROTC units, ranking first in the Southwest Region out of 36 detachments for producing the most second lieutenants in the Air Force. At the national level, (among 144 detachments), UTSA was ranked second behind Purdue University. UTSA also has a large Air Force ROTC program among Hispanic Serving Institutions . In 2009, The AFROTC unit was awarded 36 slots for field training compared to Texas A&M University, which had 32.

Student Government 
The Student Government Association, originally founded as "Student Representative Assembly" ("SRA"), was established in 1976. The organization's name changed to "Student Government Association" for the second Constitution in 1993. In October 1976, the UTSA student body voted to accept a constitution establishing the Student Representative Assembly. The constitution was drafted by a student committee and approved by the Board of Regents of the University of Texas System.

The Student Government Association (SGA) is the official voice of the university's student body. Its officers and committees reflect that of the United States federal government, using a three-branch system. Student Government hosts the University Life Awards, a large celebration in the Ballroom that recognizes excellence in leadership throughout the campus. All students are considered members of SGA, due to both the fact its activities are subsidized through the Student Services Fee and it represents the views of the entire student body.

Accomplishments credited to the association include facilitating voting for a university mascot in 1977, advocating for building a university center in 1979, sponsoring the first Fiesta UTSA in 1980, distributing the University Life Awards to recognize outstanding efforts of students, faculty and staff, expanding dining hours, advocating for the installation of the Roadrunner statue, and renovating the Sombrilla fountain.

The Paisano

The Paisano is the student-run newspaper of the university. It has remained fully independent since its inception in 1981 and has received numerous awards from the Columbia Scholastic Press Association, including a gold medal in 2000. The Paisano is the oldest independent collegiate student newspaper in Texas and one of only approximately a dozen independent student newspapers in the nation.

Traditions
The official colors of UTSA are blue and orange. The colors of the University of Texas System have historically been orange and white. Blue was selected upon the recommendation of the Student Representative Assembly in accordance with the Board of Regents' Rules and Regulations, which states "an institution may adopt one additional color to be used in connection with athletic and other activities of the institution."

The Greater Roadrunner, a bird representative of the Texas Hill Country and the American Southwest, was voted the UTSA mascot in 1977. "Rowdy the Roadrunner" attends many university functions and games. On March 1, 2008, UTSA Athletics unveiled its new logos during the Homecoming Game against Texas A&M University–Corpus Christi. The athletic markings were changed to further differentiate it from other bird mascots such as the University of Kansas Jayhawk.

Class ring 
The night before class ring ceremonies the UTSA rings are placed within the Alamo overnight, a tradition that began in 2012 as part of the university's efforts to build upon longstanding traditions.

Best Fest and Fiesta UTSA
Fiesta UTSA, an annual event held in April, began in 1978. The first Fiesta UTSA was attended by over 1,000 students and included music, a jalapeño eating contest, a watermelon seed spitting contest, a dunk tank, and other activities. Fiesta UTSA includes booths set up under the Sombrilla in a carnival atmosphere and run by Registered Student Organizations. Fiesta UTSA became the kickoff event for Fiesta San Antonio each spring, having been added to the official Fiesta San Antonio schedule in 1980. Fiesta UTSA was re-named by students in 2022, and is now known as Día en la Sombrilla. 

Best Fest, an annual celebration held in October, began in 1978 (as "Bestfest") as "a special salute to five of the state's outstanding festivals," including New Braunfels's Wurstfest, Corpus Christi's Buccaneer Days, San Antonio's Fiesta, the Texas State Fair in Dallas, and George Washington's Birthday Celebration in Laredo. It was presented by the student organization Variety 79. In 1979, the event was said to be "a salute to five of the city's outstanding festivals: Fiesta Navidena, King William Fair, La Feria del Rio, the San Antonio Stock Show and Rodeo, and the Texas Folklife Festival."

Birds Up Hand Sign 
The origins of the Birds Up hand sign dates back to 1979 during Wurstfest in New Braunfels, Texas. The gesture is made by making a fist with the palm facing away from the body, then extending the pinky finger and thumb. The thumb represents the head of the roadrunner while the pinky finger represents the tail.

Homecoming
Homecoming has many traditions at UTSA. One of the most notable is the annual Golf Cart Parade. Student organizations design and create decorated golf carts according to the year's homecoming theme. Each submission is constructed by students at the Golf Cart Decorating Party, an event held a few days before. The parade has been an official part of the university's homecoming ceremonies since 1993. In 2004 it was combined into the Rowdy Rampage Fireworks Spectacular, alongside the spirit rally and a live music concert.

University Life Awards
The University Life Awards (also known as the "ULAs") is an award ceremony sponsored by Student Government Association to recognize outstanding leadership on campus. It recognizes students, student organizations, faculty and staff who have made an exceptional difference in the UTSA community. It is touted as the university's oldest tradition. Awards include Most Outstanding Student (by colleges and classification), Greek Man and Woman of the Year, the Jane Findling Award and the Golden Feather Award.

Athletics

UTSA is San Antonio's only NCAA Division I FBS institution and is currently a member of Conference USA. The Roadrunners compete in 17 intercollegiate sports including baseball, men's and women's basketball, men's and women's cross country, football, men's and women's golf, women's soccer, softball, men's and women's tennis, men's and women's indoor and outdoor track and field, and women's volleyball. The university has hosted 17 NCAA Division I Championships since 1997 including four men's Final Fours, two women's Final Fours and a pair of women's Volleyball Championships. UTSA has captured more than 70 conference championships, appeared in more than 50 NCAA postseason appearances, and has garnered two NCA national championships. The home of the UTSA basketball and volleyball teams is the Convocation Center, a multipurpose arena with more than 4,000 seats at the UTSA Main Campus. The Park West Athletics Complex opened in 2013 as the home of the soccer and track & field programs. The baseball, softball and tennis teams all play at on-campus facilities.

UTSA maintains a rivalry with Texas State University in a series known as the I-35 Rivalry. Separated by about 50 miles (~80 km), both schools have been conference rivals since 1991, first in the Southland Conference and then in the Western Athletic Conference (WAC). UTSA and Texas State are now in different conferences, with UTSA in Conference USA (C-USA) and Texas State in the Sun Belt Conference. The leadership of both universities have stated their interest in preserving the football rivalry, even as the institutions are in different conferences.

In 2019, after working closely with Brenda Tracy who is the founder of the national campaign and non-profit SetTheExpectation, UTSA became the first university in the nation to implement the Tracey Rule which is the most comprehensive Serious Misconduct rule in the NCAA.The rule ensures that a current or prospective student-athlete who has been convicted of, pleaded guilty or no contest to a felony or misdemeanor involving Serious Misconduct, has been found a delinquent in relationship to a juvenile code equivalent, or has been disciplined by the university or athletic department at any time during enrollment at any collegiate institution (excluding temporary disciplinary action during an investigation) due to Serious Misconduct shall not be eligible for athletically related financial aid, practice or competition at The University of Texas at San Antonio.

Football

 Football has always been a great topic of conversation in the UTSA community since the university's very beginning. In a 1971 article famously titled "UTSA will not have football", president Arleigh Templeton dismissed the idea of the university acquiring a football team, stating "When we do begin playing football we will be playing the best competition available." A 2007 student referendum doubled the university's athletics fee, effectively paving the way for the program's arrival in the fall of 2011.

The football team plays its home games in the 65,000-seat Alamodome in Downtown San Antonio. The university won its first football game against Northeastern State University on September 3, 2011, in front of a record attendance of 56,743. Thus setting the NCAA's record for the highest-attended inaugural game for a start-up program. The Roadrunners also broke the attendance record for an inaugural season, averaging 35,521 per game. UTSA lead the WAC in attendance for the 2012 season. The Roadrunners now compete in Conference USA. The UTSA administration was very supportive of the move, with then-President Ricardo Romo noting the conference will fit the Roadrunners well.

Notable alumni

See also

UTSA Roadrunners
Hispanic-serving institution
Minority-serving institution

Notes

References

External links

UTSA Roadrunners Athletics

 
Universities and colleges accredited by the Southern Association of Colleges and Schools
University of Texas San Antonio
San Antonio
Educational institutions established in 1969
Universities and colleges in San Antonio
Tourist attractions in San Antonio
1969 establishments in Texas